Barton Township is a township in Worth County, Iowa, USA.

History
Barton Township was established in 1877. It was named from a Barton in England.

References

Townships in Worth County, Iowa
Townships in Iowa
Populated places established in 1877
1877 establishments in Iowa